Clare Booth (born 19 September 1964 at Liverpool) is a British former alpine skier who competed in the 1984 Winter Olympics and in the 1988 Winter Olympics.

See also
Winter Olympics

References

1964 births
Living people
Sportspeople from Liverpool
British female alpine skiers
Olympic alpine skiers of Great Britain
Alpine skiers at the 1984 Winter Olympics
Alpine skiers at the 1988 Winter Olympics